Bischheim may refer to:

Bischheim, Germany, a municipality in Rhineland-Palatinate, Germany
Bischheim, a village in the municipality of Haselbachtal, Saxony, Germany
Bischheim, Bas-Rhin, a municipality in Alsace, France
Canton of Bischheim, a former canton in Alsace, France